During the 1997–98 season, Tottenham Hotspur participated in the English Premier League.

Season summary
Despite the pre-season capture of Newcastle stars David Ginola and Les Ferdinand, Tottenham Hotspur began the season badly and looked nothing like a side who were hoping to challenge for a European place. By the time Gerry Francis resigned in November, Spurs were in the relegation zone and chairman Alan Sugar was the target of more hostility than ever before. Swiss coach Christian Gross was named as Francis's successor, and soon after arriving he brought in former Spurs star Jürgen Klinsmann - who had been so successful and popular during his first spell three seasons earlier.

In the end, Tottenham beat the drop and finished 14th in the final table. Klinsmann retired from playing, to draw the curtain on a brilliant career.

Final league table

Results summary

Results by matchday

Results
Tottenham Hotspur's score comes first

Legend

FA Premier League

FA Cup

League Cup

Squad

Left club during season

Reserve squad

Transfers

In

Out

Transfers in:  £12,150,000
Transfers out:  £3,855,000
Total spending:  £8,295,000

Statistics

Appearances and goals

|-
! colspan=14 style=background:#dcdcdc; text-align:center| Goalkeepers

|-
! colspan=14 style=background:#dcdcdc; text-align:center| Defenders

|-
! colspan=14 style=background:#dcdcdc; text-align:center| Midfielders

|-
! colspan=14 style=background:#dcdcdc; text-align:center| Forwards

|-
! colspan=14 style=background:#dcdcdc; text-align:center| Players transferred out during the season

Goal scorers 

The list is sorted by shirt number when total goals are equal.

Clean sheets

Notes

References

Tottenham Hotspur F.C. seasons
Tottenham Hotspur